Cocotal Golf & Country Club is a gated community located in Bávaro, Dominican Republic, near the Punta Cana International Airport.

Cocotal Golf & Country Club includes a 27-hole golf course designed by Jose "Pepe" Gancedo, a Spanish golfer.

It is also home to a real estate community called "Palma Real Villas" which is a Sol Meliá Hotels & Resorts development.

Golf clubs and courses in the Dominican Republic